Presidential elections were held in Mexico in 1877. They followed the overthrow of President Sebastián Lerdo de Tejada at the end of 1876 as part of the Plan of Tuxtepec. The result was a victory for Porfirio Díaz, who received 96% of the vote.

Results

President

References

Mexico
President
Presidential elections in Mexico
Election and referendum articles with incomplete results